Junior José Paredes Jaspe (born 1 January 2001) is a Venezuelan footballer who plays as a forward for Estudiantes.

Career statistics

Club

Notes

References

2001 births
Living people
Venezuelan footballers
Venezuela under-20 international footballers
Association football forwards
Atlético Morelia players
Venezuelan Primera División players
Uruguayan Primera División players
Zulia F.C. players
Montevideo City Torque players
Venezuelan expatriate footballers
Expatriate footballers in Uruguay
Sportspeople from Maracaibo